Grace Thompson was an early American silent film actress, starring in 10 films between 1914 and 1917.

Filmography
The Final Impulse (1914)
The Scarlet Sin (aka The Shepherd of the Mines) (1915) .... Edith Jackson
Mountain Justice (1915) .... Mary Kirke
The Valley of Regeneration (1915)
The Lilt of Love (1915)
The Eagle (1915)
The Millionaire Paupers (1915) .... Enid
The Man in the Chair (1915)
The Grip of Jealousy (1916) .... Beth Grant
The Curse of Eve (1917)

External links

1891 births
American silent film actresses
Year of death missing
20th-century American actresses